Marcus Ellis (born 14 September 1989) is a British badminton player. He was the men's doubles champion in the English National Championships. Ellis and Chris Langridge won a bronze medal in the men's doubles at the 2016 Summer Olympics in Rio de Janeiro, also gold medal at the 2018 Commonwealth Games in Gold Coast, Australia. At the 2019 Minsk European Games, Ellis captured two gold medals; in the men's doubles with Langridge and in the mixed doubles event with Lauren Smith.

Personal life 
Marcus Ellis, the youngest son of Sheila and John Ellis, was born on 14 September 1989 in Huddersfield, West Yorkshire.  He has an elder brother James. Ellis started playing badminton aged seven when his father took him to the Colne Valley Leisure Centre in Slaithwaite.

Ellis was first educated at Clough Head Junior School in Huddersfield, before attending Colne Valley High School, a state comprehensive school in the village of Linthwaite. He attended high school with Alex Smithies, now the goalkeeper for Huddersfield Town Football Club. He then studied for 6 months at Huddersfield New College before deciding to move away from Huddersfield at the age of 17 so he may train at the National Badminton Centre in Milton Keynes.

Ellis lived in St Albans.

Career 
In the early years of his professional career, Ellis teamed up with a number of players in the doubles, such as Tom Wolfenden and Peter Mills in the men's doubles, and Gabby Adcock and Mariana Agathangelou in the mixed. He won the men's doubles at the Denmark International in 2013 with Paul van Rietvelde.

In September 2014, he teamed up with Chris Langridge. They won their first men's doubles title in December 2014 in the Italian Open, and their first title in the English National Badminton Championships in February 2015, which they won again in 2016.  They also won the Welsh International in 2015.  They were defeated in the 2016 European Championships in La Roche-sur-Yon in the semi-finals to gain a bronze.  They have also won medals in the European Team Championships – a silver in the Mixed Team in 2015, and a bronze medal in the Men's Team in 2016.

During the 2016 Summer Olympics in Rio, Ellis and Langridge were ranked No. 22 in the world, but they managed to win a bronze, the first medal in badminton men's doubles won by a British team at the Olympics.

In 2017, he won his first Grand Prix tournament title at the Dutch Open in the mixed doubles event with Lauren Smith.

At the 2018 Commonwealth Games held on the Gold Coast, Australia, Ellis captured three medals – he won a gold in the men's doubles with Chris Langridge, which is England's first men's badminton double title at the Games in 40 years; a silver in the mixed doubles with Lauren Smith; and also a bronze in the mixed team event. At the 2018 European Championships held in Huelva, Spain, he finished in the semi final, and settled for a bronze medal in the mixed doubles event with Smith after lose a match to Danish pair Mathias Christiansen and Christinna Pedersen in the rubber games.

Ellis qualified to represent Great Britain at the 2019 European Games, played in the men's doubles with Chris Langridge and in the mixed doubles with Lauren Smith. Competed as the second seeds in the men's and mixed doubles event, he reached the finals in both events. In the men's doubles, Ellis and Langridge managed to claim the gold medal after beat the top seeds from Denmark Kim Astrup and Anders Skaarup Rasmussen in straight games 21–17, 21–10. He secured his second gold in the mixed doubles with Smith after beat their teammates the top seeds Chris Adcock and Gabby Adcock with the score 21–14, 21–9.

Ellis opened the 2020 season by achieved his biggest triumph as in just his second tournament of the season, he won his first Super 300 event in Thailand Masters partnered with Lauren Smith. He and Smith then reached in to the quarter finals of Spain Masters and semi finals of All England Open. In October, Ellis and Chris Langridge won the men's doubles title at the 2020 Denmark Open, became the first English men's doubles pair in 45 years to win the Denmark Open.

Ellis competed at the 2021 European Championships in Kyiv, Ukraine, and won a silver medal in the mixed doubles with Smith and a bronze in the men's doubles with Langridge. In July, he and Smith played at the 2020 Summer Olympics, but was eliminated in the quarter-finals.

In 2022, Ellis competed at the Commonwealth Games in Birmingham, England as mixed doubles second seed with his partner Lauren Smith. They progressed to the final, but lost to third seeded from Singapore Terry Hee and Jessica Tan, settled for the silver medal. After the Commonwealth Games, Ellis had to withdraw for the next tournament due to a hip injury and planned surgery.

Achievements

Olympic Games 
Men's doubles

Commonwealth Games 
Men's doubles

Mixed doubles

European Games 
Men's doubles

Mixed doubles

European Championships 
Men's doubles

Mixed doubles

BWF World Tour (9 titles, 3 runners-up) 
The BWF World Tour, which was announced on 19 March 2017 and implemented in 2018, is a series of elite badminton tournaments sanctioned by the Badminton World Federation (BWF). The BWF World Tour is divided into levels of World Tour Finals, Super 1000, Super 750, Super 500, Super 300, and the BWF Tour Super 100.

Men's doubles

Mixed doubles

BWF Grand Prix (1 title, 1 runner-up) 
The BWF Grand Prix had two levels, the Grand Prix and Grand Prix Gold. It was a series of badminton tournaments sanctioned by the Badminton World Federation (BWF) and played between 2007 and 2017.

Mixed doubles

  BWF Grand Prix Gold tournament
  BWF Grand Prix tournament

BWF International Challenge/Series (16 titles, 14 runners-up) 
Men's doubles

Mixed doubles

  BWF International Challenge tournament
  BWF International Series tournament
  BWF Future Series tournament

References

External links 
 
 
 
 
 
 
 
 

1989 births
Living people
Sportspeople from Huddersfield
English male badminton players
Badminton players at the 2016 Summer Olympics
Badminton players at the 2020 Summer Olympics
Olympic badminton players of Great Britain
Olympic bronze medallists for Great Britain
Olympic medalists in badminton
Medalists at the 2016 Summer Olympics
Badminton players at the 2018 Commonwealth Games
Badminton players at the 2022 Commonwealth Games
Commonwealth Games gold medallists for England
Commonwealth Games silver medallists for England
Commonwealth Games bronze medallists for England
Commonwealth Games medallists in badminton
Badminton players at the 2019 European Games
European Games gold medalists for Great Britain
European Games medalists in badminton
Medallists at the 2018 Commonwealth Games
Medallists at the 2022 Commonwealth Games